Dhap Dam is a concrete faced rockfill dam located in Bagmati Province of Nepal. The dam is 24 m high and 175 m wide. It can store 850,000 m3 of water when full.

Description 
There are three saddle dams in conjunction with the main dam to retain the water within the reservoir. The dam is owned by Bagmati River Basin Improvement Project under the Nepal government. 

The main purpose of the dam is to improve water quality and provide water security in the Bagmati River basin. It is done by allowing continuous flow in the Bagmati river in dry seasons. It is proposed to release 0.4 m3/s of flow in the dry season and additional flows in the festival seasons as necessary. It will also help to control flood in monsoon.

The project is funded by Asian Development Bank. The main civil contractor is a joint venture of Guangzhou, Lama and Raman construction. The contract is executed by Project Management and Construction Supervision Consultancy. The construction was scheduled to be complete in October 2021 but has not been completed .

Related projects 
Another 100m high dam, Nagmati Dam is planned to be constructed in tandem with the Dhap dam in the next stage.

See also
List of dams and reservoirs in Nepal

References

Dams in Nepal